Walt Disney World Inside Out is an American monthly (later weekly) television show that aired on the Disney Channel from 1994 to 1997. The show featured footage of attractions at Walt Disney World in Orlando, Florida.

The original host was comedian Scott Herriot, but in 1995 J. D. Roth and Brianne Leary took over the hosting duties with George Foreman as the co-host.

Episodes (Original Version 1994-95)

Episode 1 (June, 1994)

The inaugural episode was themed to "getting wet", but it is not limited to just water attractions. The first segment sees host Scott Herriot at Big Thunder Mountain Railroad in the Magic Kingdom, where riders are challenged to hold cups of water in their mouth during the ride.

The next segment of the show which is Scott heading to the Morocco pavilion at Epcot '94 to see Hulk Hogan who was starring in Thunder in Paradise. After Scott meets Hulk on the set, Hulk then literally gives Scott a lift to Marrakech. After hearing from the waiter that there's one tagine chicken left, Hulk and Scott arm-wrestled for it but Scott lost and ended up with a bologna sandwich. After Scott leaves Hulk to sign autographs, he heads to Disney MGM Studios to check out the then-soon to be opened Twilight Zone Tower of Terror. Scott ends the segment by saying that there will be a warning sign directly on the ride. Scott then heads back to Epcot '94 to play a game at the interactive fountain to see how many people can make it through the fountain without getting wet. Scott says that "it is like having the world's biggest squirt gun and the whole world is your little sister". After the game, Scott then meets the cast and creative director of the show Splashtacular. If you put a manhole cover on one of the super-shooters it would launch a human being about 60 to 80 feet in the air. Scott says that the fountain is "more fun than a 7-Eleven Big Gulp". Then Scott travels to The Living Seas and interviews Marine Biologist Conrad Litz about the then-new dolphin keyboard project. In a hidden camera segment, Horgi a tourist from Yensidklat (DisneyTalk backwards) asks Cast members about watermelon shoes he needs to buy.  After reviewing that there are 3 theme parks, 2 water parks, sun, fun and 108 different ways to get wet, Scott and the viewers take a look at what's coming up in the months ahead at Walt Disney World or as Scott calls it his "rootin' tootin' High flootin' Top secret tips". On June 1 Mickey Mania premieres. On July 1, Epcot '94's Innoventions opens its doors. Also from July through August, Epcot '94 puts on a big band salute to Duke Ellington. And there will be two then-new Disney resorts opening up: Disney's Wilderness Lodge and Disney's All-Star Sports Resort. Scott ends the episode with one final tip: "leave the furniture at home and please no naugahyde (fake leather)" and jokes that "you can lead a horse to water but you can't take it to the prom".

Episode 2 (July, 1994) then-soon-to-be-opened
Special Guest: Nancy KerriganMusical Guest: Sha-Shaty

In a parody of The Balled of Davey Crockett, Scott is hunting for a bear. He begins his quest at the then-new Disney's Wilderness Lodge. And unlike other great frontiersmen like Davey Crockett, Jim Bowie, or in Scott's words "David Bowie", Scott is looking for "a razor-clad, foaming at the mouth, hopefully vegetarian bear". After finding his way out of there, Scott heads to the Pirates of the Caribbean at the Magic Kingdom to play a game. The game's rules are simple: memorize the ride's theme song "(Yo Ho Yo Ho) A Pirate's Life For Me". Scott then introduces the guests that are participating. The guests then go on the ride. After the guests get off the ride, Scott tells the participants to sing the theme song. First up were Stephanie King from Tarpon Springs, Florida and Jodi Berman from Seminole, Florida. Next up were Jeff and Kristi Palmer from Orlando, Florida. Then Julie Avarista and Lou Avsrista Jr. from Greenville, Rhode Island took a crack at it. Finally Dave Ironman from Ft. Lauderdale, Florida went up. Scott tells Dave that Star Search auditions are tomorrow. After the guests are done memorizing the song, Scott introduces Dave Ironman as the winner by "using cultural references". The big prize for Dave is a stuffed parrot. Along with Dave, every guest received a T-shirt. Scott and the guests then went on the ride again. (With Scott sitting next to Dave) Scott then heads to Disney's Fort Wilderness Resort & Campground to have a chat with Gary Wade a blacksmith for the horses. After questioning about the difference between a Percheron and a Clydesdale, Scott asks Gary about the difference between a Percheron and a Buick. Gary tells Scott that the Percheron is one horsepower and the Buick is more than that. (200 hp) Gary then hammers the horseshoe on the horse. Scott says after the horse swatted at him "Hey why the long face?" with the horse thinking "Why the old joke?". Then Scott heads to Disney MGM Studios to check out   Indiana Jones Epic Stunt Spectacular!. Scott interviews Mike West the director; Show concepts for Walt Disney Imagineering. Then Scott interviews Daryl Sterner who plays the German Mechanic. Next Scott interviews Todd Warren who plays Indiana Jones. Finally Scott interviews the extras chosen for the show, or as Scott calls them "The Pastel Peasants". After those interviews, Scott tries something that he always wanted to do: Running from the huge ball in the temple set. Scott heads to Epcot '94 to talk about Innoventions. Scott doesn't know much about it but Bill Nye does because "he's a science guy". Then Bill Nye exclaims the products that became a part of our everyday lives and the innoventions of today. Scott says that "Innovations + Inventions = Innoventions" and that the future looks "mighty nice" and that is "innoventive". Scott heads back to Disney MGM Studios at The Magic of Disney Animation to take a look at The Lion King. Once inside while looking at his own drawing, Scott is informed by animator Aaron Blaise that they don't actually paint by number. Aaron then tells Scott about the making of The Lion King "in 30 seconds". Later Aaron presents Scott of a drawing of him and a bear. Aaron then tells Scott that the big bears "are attracted to dark pink shirts" but Scott is wearing a light pink shirt. The Magic Kingdom is Scott's next stop to see Nancy Kerrigan. After showing off her moves on the ice, Nancy asks Scott if he ever skated. To which Scott (wearing a Speed Skating suit) says he never skated before. Before Nancy offers to show Scott how it's done, Scott asks Nancy if she's ever timed herself of how many spins in the air. Nancy says "No" and Scott offers to time her. After Scott says "Go', Nancy begins spinning. While Nancy is spinning Scott was reading the newspaper comics, checking the stopwatch, ordering pizza, shaving and eating ice cream. After Nancy is done, Scott then tells Nancy to let him give it a try. But Scott leaped from the Magic Kingdom to Disney MGM Studios. Scott comes back to Disney's Wilderness Lodge to warm up by the fire and says that it "gets the chill out of your bones". It's revealed that three Frontiersmen were singing the song all along. The frontiersmen tell Scott that he's almost out of time and he has to go down to Pleasure Island to check out the Jazz Club. After the frontiersmen were done singing, Scott asks the viewers if they ever remember them opening for Led Zeppelin back in '74. As told, Scott heads to the Jazz Club and explain that the Jazz Club is one of then-eight great clubs on Pleasure Island and also you can listen to the great jazz of yesterday and today. After the Jazz Club, Scott plays some midway carnival games. (where he cheats on the Test Your Strength game) Then Scott checks out the New Year's Eve countdown held every night. Then Scott and the viewers once again check up on what is coming up in the months ahead at Walt Disney World. Coming soon in July The Lion King is turned into the Legend Of The Lion King stage show. Later experience the thrilling drops of The Twilight Zone Tower of Terror. "Is that the Stop button?" Mickey Mania marches down Main Street U.S.A. And so ends Episode 2 and Scott's search for a bear. While Scott is talking, he is interrupted when he sees Winnie the Pooh walking by. Scott thinks he has finally found his bear and runs towards Pooh saying that he "just wanted an autograph".

Episode 3 (August, 1994)

In the brand new and exciting edition of Walt Disney World Inside Out, Scott Herriott is your "Host, hydrolysis expert," and tour guide through Walt Disney World. First Scott heads to Disney MGM Studios to see Jim Henson's Muppet Vision 3D where he interviews guests about what they are expecting from this show. After Scott bumps into Sweetums, Scott receives his 3-D glasses and is told by Kermit the Frog that there is no videotaping inside the theater. Scott leaves Kermit saying "that guy looks a lot like Kermit the Frog" not knowing that he is the real deal. After Scott settles in, he watches the movie and kind of interacts with the Muppets. And as always the film ends with the Swedish Chef firing a cannon into the movie screen. After the film, Scott says that he can't tell the viewers about it "but it involves the Swedish Chef, a bunch of penguins and a really big cannon"  Kermit the Frog comes up to Scott and tells him that the glasses need to come back to the theater. Scott then realizes that it really is Kermit the Frog and asks him about the pie scene and Kermit offers to demonstrate. Kermit then tosses the pie into Scott's face and Scott says that "it seems so real". Kermit tells Scott that it's much how they  did it . Scott asks Kermit about having dinner tonight and that "dessert's on me". Scott then plays tennis at Disney's Grand Floridian Resort & Spa with a kid (the same kid from the intro of this episode) and indicates that the kid's mom produces the show. Then Scott talks about the Legend of the Lion King stage show at the Magic Kingdom. Scott then travels to Bay Lake and talk about "the warm sun, the cool breeze, the water gently lapping at your...lap" and the Hobie 16s before a lifeguard asks Scott if he would try the Hobie 16 out in the water by himself. Scott declines and thanks the lifeguard for asking that question. Scott heads to Disney's Caribbean Beach Resort to host the Walt Disney World Inside Out Hydro-man Water Race. After going over the layout of the course, Scott interviews the two families that are competing: The Yohe family from Syracuse, New York and The Nichols family from Boberbuck, Missouri. The race begins and the Nichols family took a small lead across the water to beach B then held on to that lead going into the paddle boat leg. But the Yohe family were catching up and pulled on ahead and they then pedaled backwards back to beach A. The Yohes take the tag and held on a huge lead going into the colored flags where under two of them the players must find a Mickey Mouse figure. But the Nichols had caught up and they were the first to find the mickey figure. The players then carry their colored flags to two traffic cones with the Nichols being the first to do so and heading towards the water slide. The Yohes were in hot pursuit but it was the Nichols family who came in first. For being the winners, the Nichols family earned these Gaudi gold medals, Goofy shirts and gift certificates. Also since everyone's a winner at Walt Disney World, the Yohe family as well earned the Goofy shirts and the gift certificates. Then Scott checks out the then-new Disney's All-Star Sports Resort. Scott heads on over to Epcot '94 to go inside Innoventions and play video games. Scott goes to Typhoon Lagoon and interviews some guests. Scott heads to the Magic Kingdom to see Fantasy In The Sky and fireworks production support manager Bernie Durgin talks about the history of fireworks at Disney World and at Disneyland. Then Scott plays golf and suggest that he and the viewers take a look at the calendar to see what is coming up in the months ahead at Disney World. The excitement of the summer of '94 continues with three then-brand new attractions. At Disney Studios experience the faster than gravity falls of the terrifying then-new Twilight Zone Tower of Terror. In the Magic Kingdom, Legend of The Lion King opens. And at Epcot '94 Innoventions (Epcot) opens for business. After signing off, Scott hits his golf ball and heads back to Disney-MGM-Studios to search for the ball. Kermit arrives and Scott shows him his club as a clue. Then the ball landed directly behind them and Kermit tells Scott that he was slicing the ball a bit to the left. After Scott and Kermit did some golfing jokes, the episode ends.

Episode 4 (September, 1994)

Note: Starting with this episode the announcer was Marc Elliot.

In this hugely international episode of Walt Disney World Inside Out, Scott Herriot is your host and multilinguist. Today, he takes the viewers on a tour of World Showcase at Epcot '94. Then the announcer Marc Elliot fills us in with what else Scott is doing in this episode. So pack your bags, grab your passports and "keep your arms and legs inside the sofa at all times" because we're heading off on a journey to visit 11 countries in "27 and a half minutes". First Scott heads to Disney-MGM-Studios to ride Star Tours. His mission: Save the universe "without messing up his hair". After interviewing guests waiting in line as well as a cast member who told Scott that the first time he put on the shirt that he was wearing he felt that he "looked like a parking cone", Scott goes on the ride but before the ride began Scott said "May the force be with you, live long and prosper and Remember the Alamo". After the ride Scott asks some kids where the restrooms are. Scott begins his tour of World Showcase starting in Germany. Scott says that Germany "makes you think of cities like Hamburg, Friedberg, Steven Spielberg, me in lederhosen". Then Scott talks to Patrick Hanfert and Katrin Schnadt two of the cast members in Germany. Then Scott gives out the first of four international questions about Germany. "Lederhosen translates literally to leather pants and your question is: Do you think I should wear them more often?". Both Katrin and Patrick said "No" and "Absolutely not". Scott asks how Germans say Mickey Mouse which leads into the next segment that deals with Mickey Mania the Magic Kingdom's then-newest parade. Then Scott travels to Japan and talks to two more cast members. He also gives the second question: "Godzilla. Do you think that he should be a good running mate in 1996?". The two cast members didn't come up with an answer so Scott heads on down to Discovery Island " a huge island zoo and anyone can come and see it. It's a place full of wild animals and strange sounds. A place not unlike my own dressing room". After Scott disembarked the boat, Kim Murphy The Walt Disney Company's corporate V.P. for environmental policy shows Scott around the island (including the Birds of Prey show area). In a remote segment, Howie Mandel interviews guests and goes onto the Backlot Studio tour. Scott then continues the World Showcase adventure by going to Mexico. Then Scott asks the 3rd international question: "With all the countries in World Showcase, how are we going to see them all before the end of the program?" The correct answer was "The Cool Camera Effect". Scott heads on down to Disney's Port Orleans Resort to see and interview Denny Zavett. (Later he played the kazoo) Scott goes to Innoventions to interview guests and make phone calls. The last stop of Scott's World Showcase adventure is the United Kingdom where he interviews cast members Chris Larmour and Pauline Chinnison. Then we take a look at the calendar to check up on what's coming in the months ahead at Walt Disney World. Starting December 18 to January 1, Mickey's Very Merry Christmas Parade rolled down Main Street U.S.A. Scott was given sausage and potatoes instead of the bangers and mash that he ordered. And with that, the episode ends.

Episode 5 (October, 1994)
Welcome to the spooky Halloween episode of Walt Disney World Inside Out. So grab a cape, slick back your hair and no this isn't a convention honoring Elvis Presley, it's just Scott Herriot bringing you another wacky, weird and "batty" episode of Walt Disney World Inside Out. First in a remote segment, Gilbert Gotfried tries to solve the mystery of The Twilight Zone Tower of Terror. Then at the Magic Kingdom, Scott interviews guests by asking them what are they going to dress up like for Halloween. Scott heads to the Walt Disney World costume department at the Disney-MGM-Studios and tried on a few costumes. Scott then goes to make-up and has the look of a werewolf when the whole make-up process finished or as Scott calls it: "a cross between Jack Nicholson and a poodle" . Scott meets some of the Disney villains and asked them if they would turn him back into himself. But the Disney villains turned Scott into a monkey much to his disappointment. Then a segment at Pleasure Island's improv comedy theater. Scott goes to check out the Never Land Club at Disney's Polynesian Resort when one of the kids dressed up in a costume that looks exactly like Scott's clothes. Scott then rides Maelstrom at Epcot '94. Scott eats candy at the Magic Kingdom. Then a trip to Innoventions and Walt Disney Imagineering Labs where Scott tries the then-new vr attraction Aladdin's Magic Carpet ride. Scott heads back to the Magic Kingdom to ride the Haunted Mansion. Then a look at the calendar to check up on what's coming to Walt Disney World in the months ahead. Mickey's Very Merry Christmas Party was at the Magic Kingdom from December 2 to the 16. Also in December, Planet Hollywood opened at Pleasure Island. Scott wishes the viewers a great and happy Halloween before turning into a bat or as Scott calls it "a rat with wings". Then a stagehand whacks Scott with a broomstick ending the episode.

Episode 6 (November, 1994)
This episode is about transportation through all of Walt Disney World's three theme parks. Its featured segments are Magic Kingdom's Splash Mountain, monorails, the Hoop-de-doo Musical Revue dinner show, Seven Seas Lagoon Ferry at Epcot, and animatronics. Last but not least, Victoria & Albert's restaurant. To close out the episode, Scott sits in a tram and tells some guests that when they're looking for their vehicle, all of the parking spots are named after the famous Disney characters. Scott personally parked on Goofy. As it turns out, when Scott arrives at the Magic Kingdom, he sees his polka dot Volkswagen beetle literally on top of Goofy! Goofy tells Scott to give his car a start. Scott opens the door to find the Walt Disney World Inside Out insider a television set that knows all and tells all about what's coming up in the months ahead at Walt Disney World. First a look at celebrating New Year's Eve at Pleasure Island, the new Tommorowland opened in November " It's a blast! ". And Mickey's Very Merry Christmas Party began in December. Scott and Goofy sign off the episode.

Episode 7 (December, 1994)
Scott celebrates Christmas at Walt Disney World. This episode features guest star Kathie Lee Gifford singing "Winter Wonderland". The guest game in this episode is called the "Kooky-Cookie Guest Game". The two families that are competing are the Fleming family from London, England and the Malcarny family from Pennsylvania. The Malcarny family ended up being the winners and received as their prize a rolling pin and both families get cookie jars. Then a look at the Walt Disney World Inside Out insider starting with the opening of the new Tommorowland, the opening of Planet Hollywood on December 17, the opening of the then-new Disney's All Star Music Resort, throughout January is the Walt Disney World Fitness Fest, the Twilight Zone Tower of Terror offered a real Friday the 13th fright, and the LPGA played a tournament at the Eagle Pines golf course from January 20 to the 22nd. At the end of the episode, Scott wishes the viewers Happy Holidays then tells his reindeer to start pulling his sofa but sees that there weren't any reindeer. He then resorts to plan B: Pulling the sled himself with the reindeer on his couch! Scott says that Santa is going to have a very merry hernia this year and tells the reindeer "This isn't a mule flight boys!" .

Note: Second appearance of the Walt Disney World Inside Out insider.

Episode 8 (January, 1995)
Special musical guest: Tag Team (group)

Welcome to the super frost-free episode of Walt Disney World Inside Out. So slather on some sunscreen and leave those cold winters behind because we're jumping into warm and fun in the sun on Walt Disney World Inside Out. First, Scott heads to the new Tomorrowland where he interviews guests and experienced ExtraTERRORestrial Alien Encounter. After being covered in green slime and wondering where one of his shoes are, Scott heads to the marina near Disney's Polynesian Resort to do some water skiing. But Scott fails at both attempts. Scott goes to Epcot '95 to see manatees at The Living Seas with Kim Murphy and later Honey, I Shrunk the Audience!. After returning to normal size, Scott goes to the opening of Planet Hollywood at Pleasure Island where he interviews various celebrities and thinks that his couch should be included in Planet Hollywood. Then it's back to the Magic Kingdom for a performance by Tag Team. To close out the episode, Scott relaxes at Disney's All-Star Music Resort when a beach ball bounces off of him. After some kids apologize to Scott, Scott then goes to get the ball. What he finds is the Walt Disney World Inside Out Insider that was behind the beach ball. The Disney Village Marketplace kicks off a 20th anniversary celebration. At The Land, Simba, Timon and Pumbaa star in Circle of Life premiering on January 20. On January 26, Joane Collins visits Disney MGM Studios. China (Epcot) rings in the Chinese New Year for the year of the pig. Beginning February 25, college students from across the country come to Walt Disney World for Spring Break '95. A bit of Mardi Gras and New Orleans come to Pleasure Island February 25–28. Scott signs off the episode by saying that Ariel is calling dibs on the lobster and dives into the pool.

Episode 9 (February, 1995)

Welcome to the loads of love episode of Walt Disney World Inside Out where Scott Herriot is your host, poet and a man who hasn't have a date since 1972. So as Scott says "Grab your special someone, cuddle up real close with each other preferably," and enjoy this Valentine's Day edition of Walt Disney World Inside Out. Also Scott sees a letter written to him from his "secret admirer" telling him to meet at the castle at the end of the show. First Scott heads to Mickey's Starland at the Magic Kingdom to try to find Mickey Mouse and Minnie Mouse, the most famous Disney couple of all time. And it's NOT George Washington and his wife Martha Washington! After receiving some "romantic" advice, Scott goes to the France pavilion at Epcot '95 where he asks some guests what would be the perfect gift Scott should give to his "secret admirer". And later Scott tries on some perfume. Scott goes to the Walt Disney World horticulture department and was given a tour of the different kinds of flowers and topiary sculptures by Katy Warner. Then a look at Beauty & The Beast Live On Stage. Scott goes to Disney's Yacht Club Resort and works out at the health & fitness center. At the end of Scott's work out, he feels every muscle in his body. Then a look at a real Disney fairy tale wedding at the Magic Kingdom. Then Scott goes to the Coral Reef Restaurant at Epcot '95 and interview guests. Also Scott was mistaken for a waiter and helped another waiter with table 5's request of more water for the drinks. Then Scott interviews Joane Collins and later attends her book signing at Disney MGM Studios. Scott heads back to the Magic Kingdom to get ready for his date with his secret admirer. But first a look at the Walt Disney World Inside Out Insider. Bryant Gumbel comes to the Eagle Pines and Osbrey Ridge golf courses March 3–5 for his 6th annual celebrity amateur tournament. St. Patrick's Day comes to Pleasure Island March 17. Galaxy Search at the new Tomorrowland theater. World Showcase at Epcot '95 celebrates Kids day. Fort Wilderness Resort & Campground offers a more rustic camping experience. Throughout April, high school seniors party at Walt Disney World for Grad Night. Scott signs off as he is prepared for his date. But it turns out that Scott's "secret admirer" is none other than the evil queen from Snow White!

Episode 10 (March, 1995)

Episode 11 (April, 1995)
Special Guest: Bill Fagerbakke

Welcome to the Disney people (Cast Members) episode of Walt Disney World Inside Out.

Episode 12 (May, 1995)
Note: This is the last episode of Walt Disney World Inside Out in its monthly and original format and Scott Herriot's last episode as host.

Welcome to the food and fun episode of Walt Disney World Inside Out as Scott Heriot takes you to the different restaurants and eateries around Walt Disney World.

Notable episodes and facts about the weekly version (1995-1997)
 The 25th anniversary kickoff episode was J.D. Roth and Brianne Leary's first episode as hosts. [4]
 The episode covering the opening weekend of the Disney Institute had a special encore presentation. [5]
 This episode covers ESPN Wide World of Sports (then known as Disney's Wide World of Sports) and features a look into the complex, two interviews with Junior Brignac and Ben Wyatt, George Foreman interviewing the U.S. Junior Olympic gymnastics team and a look at the then-new Hercules Zero to Hero parade. [6]

There were changes for the weekly version of Walt Disney World Inside Out including a stage, studio audience, "Trivia Test Time" where Brianne Leary or an audience member asks questions about the Walt Disney World Resort and J.D. Roth and Brianne Leary come up with the answer, a segment for George Foreman called "George's Corner", "Disney Institute Update", trivia segments (Q&A) before and after commercial breaks, performances by top artists and during the "Summer Edition" of Walt Disney World Inside Out, a Did You Know? segment, "WAY Inside Out" hosted by Talia Osteen and "George's Mail Bag" where a group of kids read questions from viewers and George Foreman answers them. Also, some episodes were filmed at Disneyland Resort and were titled as Disneyland Inside Out.

Walt Disney World Inside Out aired Sundays after The Magical World of Disney on Disney Channel.

References

1994 American television series debuts
1997 American television series endings
Disney Channel original programming
Walt Disney World